Okan Salmaz (born 17 July 1992) is a Turkish professional footballer who plays as a winger for Ceyhanspor. Salmaz is also a youth international.

References

External links

1992 births
Living people
Turkish footballers
Turkey youth international footballers
Turkey under-21 international footballers
Adanaspor footballers
Association football midfielders